Wilder Graben is a river of Thuringia, Germany.

It is a headstream of the Seebach. The confluence with the other headstream, the Mühlbach, is located southeast of Niederdorla.

See also
List of rivers of Thuringia

References

Rivers of Thuringia
Rivers of Germany